Artur Lind (6 April 1927, Vändra – 30 November 1989, Tartu) was an Estonian biologist and is considered to be the founder of molecular biology in Estonia.

Lind studied to be a surgeon at the University of Tartu. Due to an allergic reaction to analgesics used at the time, he was unable to continue working as a surgeon and moved to the faculty of biochemistry instead.

He is credited with the discovery of 5S ribosomal RNA.

His remains are buried in Vana-Jaani cemetery in Tartu. The Sepapaja 6 office building in Ülemiste City is named after Artur Lind.

References 

Estonian biologists
1927 births
1989 deaths
Molecular biologists
Estonian surgeons
People from Vändra
University of Tartu alumni
20th-century surgeons
20th-century biologists